Cape Hill is an area in Smethwick, Sandwell, West Midlands. It is centred on the road of the same name and includes the adjoining streets. Cape Hill starts at Waterloo Road near Shireland Collegiate Academy and ends at the High Street near Victoria Park. Cape Hill finishes at the start of the Dudley Road which forms the boundary with Birmingham and leads to Birmingham City Centre. Cape Hill is Smethwick's busiest shopping area.

History
The area began to be developed in the latter part of the 19th century.  Henry Mitchell bought a large plot of land alongside the road and built his brewery there in 1879.  This became Mitchells & Butlers Brewery when he entered into partnership with William Butler in 1897.  The brewery grounds even included a county standard cricket pitch where Worcestershire CCC played an annual match.  During the 19th and early 20th centuries the area became a thriving industrial and commercial area and in the 1950s and 60s it was a centre of immigration from the Commonwealth.

Facing each other on opposite corners of Durban Road are Cape Hill Primary School and the building which was once the local dispensary.  Both were constructed in red brick with terracotta facings, the dispensary in 1888 and the school in 1890.  Neither building has changed its exterior appearance to any significant extent.  The school is still providing education for the local children but the dispensary is now an "at risk" Grade II Listed Building.  There have been plans to turn the building into an emergency refuge for asylum seekers, a casino and a restaurant but none of these has come to fruition.

Smethwick as a whole had several cinemas which had all closed by 1970.  The earliest was the Cape Electric Cinema, built in 1911. Just off Cape Hill, on Windmill Lane, was the Gaumont Cinema.  The site originally held a skating rink, built in 1909.  This was sold and converted into a cinema, named the Rink Picture House, in 1912.  In 1928 it was taken over by Denman Picture Houses, the old building demolished and the current building erected.  This was the named the Gaumont cinema which lasted until 1964, when it became a bingo hall eventually taken over by the Mecca Bingo chain.  The bingo club closed in 2005, but the building still survives in use as the Victoria Suite.

Shopping
It is a busy shopping area of mainly mostly Asian small businesses, but which also includes Windmill Retail Park including an Asda, Matalan, Iceland and other high street branded stores and various chain fast food restaurants. It has a large indoor market located just off Cape Hill on Windmill Lane.

Transport
Cape Hill is served by several bus routes to places including Birmingham, Dudley, and West Bromwich. Most of the buses serving here are operated by National Express West Midlands.  It is just over a mile from Smethwick Rolfe Street station, located on Rolfe Street, off the High Street in Smethwick.

References

Areas of Sandwell
Smethwick